The Rue Croix-des-Petits-Champs is a street in the 1st arrondissement of Paris, France.

Name
The street was built on a land that consisted of gardens named petits champs ("small fields"). A cross (croix in French) was located next to a house in the street, near the Rue des Pélicans.

History
A part of this public road was opened during the reign of Philip Augustus. In 1685, as a part of the re-organisation of Place des Victoires, King Louis XIV requested the houses of the road to be aligned to open a perspective onto his bronze statue. The part of the street affected by this decision was named Rue d'Aubusson after François, Vicomte d'Aubusson, who at the time was building an hôtel particulier on Place des Victoires. Later, the name Rue Croix-des-Petits-Champs was used for the entire road. On Germinal 3, Year X (March 24, 1802), a ministerial decision signed by Jean-Antoine Chaptal set the minimum width of the street at 10 m. The minimum width was extended to 12 m by a royal order dated May 2, 1837.

Notable buildings
In 1793, Doctor Guillotin resided at the Hôtel Gesvres on Rue Croix-des-Petites-Champs.
No. 43: Hôtel Portalis or Hôtel de Jaucourt, built in 1733 by master-mason Sébastien Charpentier and designed by architect  for Countess Pierre de Jaucourt, née Marie-Josèphe de Graves.

Famous inhabitants
Jean-Baptiste Jacques Augustin (1759-1832), miniature portrait painter, lived at former No. 25 until at least 1831.
Famous lawyer  lived at No. 42 (Hôtel de Lussan).

See also
List of streets in the 1st arrondissement of Paris

References

Streets in the 1st arrondissement of Paris